The 1975 WFA Cup Final was the 6th final of the FA Women's Cup, England's primary cup competition for women's football teams. It was the fifth final to be held under the direct control of Women's Football Association (FA).

Match

Summary

The match ended 4-2 in favour of Southampton.

References

External links
 
 Report at WomensFACup.co.uk

Cup
Women's FA Cup finals
April 1975 sports events in the United Kingdom